The United States Air Force's 373d Intelligence, Surveillance and Reconnaissance Group is a Twenty-Fifth Air Force unit located at Joint Base Elmendorf-Richardson, Alaska.

Mission
The 373 ISRG is the Department of Defense host service organization and primary force provider for the National Security Agency's Alaska Mission Operations Center, providing warfighters and strategic/national level policy makers with actionable, time-critical intelligence.

History
The group was first organized in 1943.  It transferred, without personnel and equipment, to England on 7 July 1943 and assigned to Eighth AF. The group used Supermarine Spitfires and Stinson L-5s to obtain information about bombardment targets and damage inflicted by bombardment operations; provide mapping service for air and ground units; observe and report on enemy transportation, installations, and positions; and obtain data on weather conditions.

Prior to June 1944, the group photographed airfields, cities, industrial establishments, and ports in France, the Low Countries, and Germany. Received a Distinguished Unit Citation for operations during the period 31 May – 30 June 1944, when its coverage of bridges, marshalling yards, canals, highways, rivers, and other targets contributed much to the success of the Normandy campaign.

The unit covered missile sites in France during July, and in August carried out photographic mapping missions for ground forces advancing across France. It provided reconnaissance support for the airborne attack on the Netherlands in September and for the Battle of the Bulge, December 1944– January 1945. Used North American P-51 Mustangs to escort its own reconnaissance planes during the last months of the war as the group supported the Allied drive across the Rhine and into Germany. Took part in the final bomb damage assessment following V–E Day

Lineage
 Constituted as 7th Photographic Group on 5 February 1943
 Activated on 1 May 1943
 Redesignated 7th Photographic Reconnaissance and Mapping Group in May 1943
 Redesignated 7th Photographic Group (Reconnaissance) in November 1943
 Redesignated 7th Reconnaissance Group in June 1945
 Inactivated in England on 21 November 1945
 Disbanded on 6 March 1947
 Reconstituted 31 July 1985 and redesignated 373d Electronic Warfare Group
 Redesignated 373d Intelligence Group
 Activated on 16 September 2000
 Redesignated 373d Intelligence, Surveillance and Reconnaissance Group on 1 January 2009

Assignments
 Second Air Force, 1 May 1943
 VIII Air Force Service Command, 7 July 1943
 325th Photographic Wing (later 325th Reconnaissance Wing), 9 August 1944
 United States Strategic Air Forces (later United States Air Forces in Europe), 16 July 1945 – 21 November 1945
 70th Intelligence Wing (later 70th Intelligence, Surveillance and Reconnaissance Wing), 16 September 2000 – present

Components
 13th Photographic Squadron (later 13th Photographi Reconnaissance Squadron): 7 July 1943 – 21 November 1945
 14th Photographic Squadron (later 14th Photographic Reconnaissance Squadron): 7 July 1943 – 21 November 1945
 22nd Photographic Squadron (later 22nd Photographic Reconnaissance Squadron): 7 July 1943 – 21 November 1945
 22d Tactical Reconnaissance Squadron: 29 January 1945 – 29 July 1945
 27th Photographic Reconnaissance Squadron: 9 December 1943 – 21 November 1945
 28th Photographic Squadron: 1 May 1943 - 21 June 1943
 29th Photographic Squadron: 1 May 1943 - 21 June 1943
 30th Photographic Squadron: 1 May 1943 - 21 June 1943
 301st Intelligence Squadron: 16 September 2000–present
 373d Support Squadron (later 373d Intelligence Support Squadron): 16 September 2000 – c. 1 June 2015
 381st Intelligence Squadron: 1 June 2008 – present

Stations
 Peterson Field, Colorado, 1 May 1943
 RAF Mount Farm, England, 7 July 1943
 RAF Chalgrove, England, March 1945
 Hitcham Air Depot, England, October 1945 - 21 November 1945
 Misawa AB, Japan, 7 Sep 2000
 Joint Base Elmendorf Richardson c. 1 July 2015 – present

Aircraft
 Piper L-4 Grasshopper
 Stinson L-5 Sentinel
 Lockheed P-38 Lightning
 Supermarine Spitfire PR XI
 North American P-51 Mustang

Decorations
 
 Distinguished Unit Citation
 France 31 May 1944 - 30 June 1944
 
 Air Force Outstanding Unit Award
 
 French Croix de Guerre with Palm
 1944
 
 European Theater of World War II
 Campaigns

 Air Offensive, Europe
 Normandy
 Northern France
 Rhineland

 Ardennes-Alsace
 Central Europe
 Air Combat, EAME

See also 
Signals intelligence
Electronic intelligence

References

Notes

Bibliography

External links

Twenty-Fifth Air Force
 Misawa Air Base, Japan
 Joint Base Elmendorf-Richardson, Alaska

Intelligence groups of the United States Air Force
Reconnaissance groups of the United States Air Force
1943 establishments in Colorado